Heinrich Wilhelm Ferdinand Wackenroder (8 March 1798 Burgdorf, Hanover – 4 September 1854 Jena) was a German chemist.

Career and work

In June, 1826 Wackenroder published his doctoral dissertation, “On Anthelminthics in the Vegetable Kingdom,” presented to Göttingen University, which earned him praise, and the Royal Prize.

In 1827 he obtained his doctorate from the University of Erlangen, becoming an associate professor the following year at the University of Jena, where he worked with Johann Wolfgang Döbereiner (1780-1849). In 1836 he was appointed Professor ordinarius and Director of the Pharmacy Institute, later known as the Chemical-Pharmaceutical Institute. He became
especially known for his discovery of carotin and his correspondence with Goethe. In subsequent years he became co-editor of Archiv der Pharmazie.

In 1826 Wackenroder isolated corydalin from Corydalis cava and in 1831 isolated carotin in an ether extract from carrots. In 1845 he discovered the Wackenroder solution, a polythionic acid, resulting from the reaction of dilute sulphuric acid with hydrogen sulphide.

Writings 
 Chemische Tabellen zur Analyse der unorganischen Körper (1829)
 Synoptische Tabellen über die chemischen Verbindungen erster Ordnung (1830)
 Ausführliche Charakteristik der wichtigsten Stickstoffreihen organischer Säuren (1841)
 Chemische Klassifikation der einfachen und zusammengesetzten Körper und die wichtigsten Verbindungen derselben (1851)

References

Other sources
 
 Wolfram Wendler: Der akademische Unterricht in der Pharmazie um die Mitte des 19. Jahrhunderts : dargestellt an der Mitschrift einer Vorlesung Heinrich Wilhelm Ferdinand Wackenroders aus dem Jahre 1845. Diss. Marburg 2004

External links

 MDR: Geschichte Mitteldeutschlands
 www.erfurt-web.de

1798 births
1854 deaths
19th-century German chemists
People from Hanover Region
Academic staff of the University of Jena
German pharmacists

ru:Политионовые кислоты